Miranda is a suburb in southern Sydney, in the state of New South Wales, Australia. The suburb is known as a commercial centre for the southern suburbs. Miranda is 24 kilometres south of the Sydney central business district, in the Sutherland Shire.

History
Thomas Holt (1811–88) owned the land that stretched from Sutherland to Cronulla. James Murphy, the manager of the Holt estate named the area after Miranda, a character in the William Shakespeare play The Tempest. In a 1921 letter, James Murphy said "the name Miranda was given to the locality by me as manager of the Holt Sutherland Company which I formed in 1881. I thought it a soft, euphonious, musical and appropriate name for a beautiful place." It is believed that the character in the play was named after Miranda de Ebro, a town in Spain.

Early Australian explorer Gregory Blaxland was promised a significant parcel of land in the area as a reward for discovering a passage through the Blue Mountains.  He had not selected his parcel by 1816, when he chose to sell that promise to John Connell for £250.  However, in 1831 he also selected a parcel of land and claimed it under the original promise of reward, at which Connell stepped forward to claim the land.  The matter was taken to court, where Connell was recognised as the owner.

In the 1860s the parcel was sold to Holt, who planned a sheep and cattle farm. The plan failed but the fertile ground was leased to market gardeners instead.

In 1918, the Miranda War Memorial was built in the grounds of the then Miranda Public School (now part of Miranda Westfield).

By the 1920s, steam trams operated between Cronulla and Sutherland, via Miranda. The trip from Miranda to Sutherland took fifteen minutes and cost three pence (2.5 cents). In 1923 there were five shops in Miranda, including a post office and butcher, at the intersection of the main road from Sutherland and Port Hacking Road. Settlements of returned soldiers from World War I were well established in Miranda at this time and the area was considered to be one of the best fruit-growing and poultry farming areas.

In 1955, Miranda Library opened.

In 1968, the war memorial moved to the cul-de-sac at the end of Central Road.

Miranda will receive FTTC technology as the National Broadband Network is rolled out.

Commercial areas

Miranda is the main retail and commercial centre of the Sutherland Shire with shops located on either side of the railway line. 

Westfield Miranda (previously known as Miranda Fair) is large shopping centre in the middle of the suburb, adjacent to the Miranda railway station. 

There are also two smaller shopping centres nearby, Lederer Shopping Centre Miranda (previously known as Parkside Plaza) and The Kiora Centre. Miranda also has a shopping strip, running along Kingsway and Kiora Road. Numerous commercial developments are also located on these roads and surrounding streets. 

Miranda also has a light industrial area located in the north part of the centre and is located on Port Hacking and Box Roads. 

The Miranda Hotel is also located on Kingsway and was formerly the Miranda Rex. It was originally designed in the 1950s by Lipson & Kadd who also designed the Padstow Hotel.

Transport

 Kingsway, Port Hacking Road, The Boulevarde and Kiora Road are the main roads through Miranda. Until 2002 a Miranda landmark was called "the number one black spot in the State for minor accidents," the five-ways roundabout which intersected The Boulevard, Kiora Road and Port Hacking Road. An AUD$8m project was completed from 25 February 2002 – 20 November 2002 to remove the roundabout and implement a series of traffic lights at the intersection.  Collisions at the intersection fell from 222 in 2002 to 13 in 2003.
 Miranda railway station is on the Cronulla branch of the Illawarra line on the Sydney Trains network. The railway station gives quick access to Cronulla Beach by train.
 Transit Systems, Maianbar Bundeena Bus Service and Transdev NSW provide bus service to Miranda. For full route details see Miranda Station.

Population
According to the 2016 census of Population, there were 15,284 residents in Miranda. 68.3% of people were born in Australia. The next most common countries of birth were England 3.6%, China 3.0%, New Zealand 2.3%, India 1.5% and Philippines 1.2%. 73.8% of people spoke only English at home. Other languages spoken at home included Mandarin 3.0%, Greek 2.2%, Cantonese 1.6%, Italian 1.4% and Spanish 1.3%. The most common responses for religion were Catholic 28.8%, No Religion 23.6% and Anglican 17.7%.

Sport 
Miranda is home to several sports teams, including:

 Miranda Magpies FC (soccer)
 Miranda Magpies Cricket Club (cricket)
 Miranda Magpies Netball Club (Netball)
 Miranda Magpies AFC (AFL)
 Miranda Magpies Football Club (Rugby League)

Gallery

References

Suburbs of Sydney
Sutherland Shire